Barking Town Urban District Council Light Railways operated a passenger tramway service in Barking between 1903 and 1929.

History

Barking Town Urban District Council opened services on this tramway on 1 December 1903. With a total of 2.8 route miles, this was one of the shortest tramway operations in Britain.

The depot was located at

Fleet

1-3 Brush Electrical Engineering Company 1903
4-5 Brush Electrical Engineering Company 1903 (withdrawn in 1926)
6-7 Brush Electrical Engineering Company 1903
8 Brush Electrical Engineering Company 1911 (sold to Ilford Urban District Council Tramways in 1915)
9 Brush Electrical Engineering Company 1911 (sold to East Ham Corporation Tramways in 1915)
10 Brush Electrical Engineering Company 1912 (sold to Ilford Urban District Council Tramways in 1914)

Closure

On 16 February 1929 the last services were replaced by buses.

References

Tram transport in England
Trams in London